Uotila is a Finnish surname. Notable people with the surname include:

 Leena Uotila (born 1947), Finnish actress
 Kari Uotila (born 1955), Finnish politician
 Sami Uotila (actor) (born 1971), Finnish actor
 Sami Uotila (skier) (born 1976), Finnish alpine skier
 Maikki Uotila (born 1977), Finnish ice dancer
 Juha Uotila (born 1985), Finnish professional ice hockey defenceman

Finnish-language surnames